Doug Olds was an Australian rules footballer who played in the South Australian National Football League ('SANFL') for the Norwood Football Club from 1944 to 1957.

References

Norwood Football Club players
Australian rules footballers from South Australia
South Australian Football Hall of Fame inductees